Preaching at the Breeze is the third live album by German power metal band Powerwolf. It was released on 6 January 2017.

Track listing

Personnel 
 Attila Dorn – vocals
 Matthew Greywolf – lead guitar
 Charles Greywolf – rhythm guitar
 Roel van Helden – drums, percussion
 Falk Maria Schlegel – keyboards

References 

2017 live albums
Powerwolf live albums